Exomilus lutarius is a species of sea snail, a marine gastropod mollusk in the family Raphitomidae.

Description
The length of the shell attains 3 mm, its diameter 1.15 mm.

(Original description) The small, solid shell is cylindrical and abruptly truncate above. It contains five whorls, three forming the protoconch, sloping on the shoulder, perpendicular at the side, and concave at the base. The colour of the shell is grey (? bleached). 

The sculpture consists of deep narrow pits are formed by the intersection of radial and spiral sculpture. The radials are strong, prominent and perpendicular. The ribs are continuous, about a dozen to a whorl, knotted at the crossing of the spirals, which number four on the upper and twelve on the lower whorl. The spiral defines the basal angle larger and more prominent. 

Protoconch : first whorl wound oblique to the axis of the main shell, the second overhanging the third, appearing as if the apex was wrapped in a turban. 

The aperture is long, narrow, fortified by a heavy varix, in the anterior angle of which is excavated a deep sinus. The columella is nearly straight, overlaid by a slight callus. The siphonal canal is very short and wide.

Distribution
This marine species is endemic to Australia and occurs off New South Wales.

References

 Laseron, C. 1954. Revision of the New South Wales Turridae (Mollusca). Australian Zoological Handbook. Sydney : Royal Zoological Society of New South Wales pp. 56, pls 1–12.

External links
 

lutarius
Gastropods described in 1907
Gastropods of Australia